= Paisin, California =

Settlement in California, U.S.

Paisin (also Pagnines, Pagosines, Pagsin, Paycines, and Paysim) is a former Kalindaruk (Costanoan) settlement in Monterey County, California, United States.

Paisin was situated near Monterey Bay, but its precise location is unknown.

== See also ==
- Native American history of California
